Societas Rosicruciana in Anglia (Rosicrucian Society of England) is a Rosicrucian esoteric Christian order formed by Robert Wentworth Little in 1865, although some sources acknowledge the date to be 1866-67. Members are confirmed from the ranks of subscribing Master Masons of a Grand Lodge in amity with United Grand Lodge of England.

The structure and grade of this order, as A. E. Waite suggests, were derived from the 18th-century German Order of the Golden and Rosy Cross. It later became the same grade system used for the Golden Dawn.

History
The society claims to be inspired by the original Rosicrucian Brotherhood but does not allege a provable link thereto. It bases its teachings on those found in the Fama and Confessio Fraternitas published in the early 17th century in Germany along with other similar publications from the same time.

The society was founded in 1867, derived from a pre-existing Rosicrucian order in Scotland (which bore no relation to the similarly named Societas Rosicruciana in Scotia, which was a later creation), following the admission of William James Hughan and Robert Wentworth Little.  Little was a clerk and cashier of the General Secretary of the United Grand Lodge of England, William Henry White. These Fratres were advanced quickly in Scotland and granted a warrant to form a Society in England.  The formation meeting took place on 1 June 1867 in Aldermanbury, London with Frater Little elected Master Magus, the title of "Supreme Magus" not being invented until some years later.

They produced a journal, called The Rosicrucian, which was co-edited by William Robert Woodman.

Membership requirements
The society requires all aspirants for membership from the ranks of subscribing Master Masons of a Grand Lodge in amity with United Grand Lodge of England to declare a belief in the fundamental
principles of the Trinitarian Christian faith and offers assistance to all its members in
working out the great problems of nature and science.

Structure and governance

The Order is subdivided into:

1st Order
Members of the 1st Order(Fratres) meet in a College which is equivalent to a Freemasons Lodge. A College is empowered to confer the first four degrees of the society which are known as Grades. A minimum of six months must elapse between the receipt of grades. However, the emphasis in the work of the society is learning, therefore every member is encouraged to deliver a paper of their own work on some topic of interest in open college.

Grade I    -  Zelator
Grade II   -  Theoricus
Grade III  -  Practicus
Grade IV   -  Philosophus

2nd Order
This is equivalent to a Masonic Provincial Grand Lodge headed by a Chief Adept and his deputy (Suffragan) who have jurisdiction over all first order Colleges within the Province. The Chief Adept is empowered to confer three further Grades at this level to deserving Fratres of Grade IV who have been a member of the Society for a minimum of four years.

Grade V    -  Adeptus Minor
Grade VI   -  Adeptus Major
Grade VII  -  Adeptus Exemptus

A minimum of one year must elapse between the receipt of grades at this level. A member can only serve as the Celebrant (Master) of a College of the First Order after receiving the Grade of Adeptus Exemptus.

3rd Order
This is equivalent to a Grand Lodge headed by a Supreme Magus, Senior Substitute Magus and Junior Substitute Magus. Members of the second order who have given service to the society and been selected by the Supreme Magus for such advancement may be awarded a further two Grades.

Grade VIII -  Magister
Grade IX   -  Magus

Influences

In 1888, three members of SRIA formed the Hermetic Order of the Golden Dawn, which removed the restriction on membership, allowing non-Christians, non-Freemasons, and women to join. A great deal of the SRIA structure survived in the new order, which went on to greatly influence the modern occult revival in the 20th century.

Supreme Magus

 Robert Wentworth Little (1869–1878)
 William Robert Woodman (1878–1891)
 William Wynn Westcott (1891–1925)
 W. J. Songhurst (1925–1939)
 Frank M. Rickard (1939–1956)
 W. R. Semken (1956–1969)
 Edward Varley Kayley (1969–1974)
 Donald Penrose (1974–1979)
 Norman C. Stamford (1979–1982)
 Alan G. Davies (1982–1994)
 Ronald E. Rowland (1994–2002)
 Andrew B. Stevenson (2002–2006)
 John Paternoster (2006–2019)
 Anthony W. Llewellyn (2019–present)

Known members
William Robert Woodman
William Wynn Westcott
Kenneth R. H. Mackenzie
Samuel Liddell "MacGregor" Mathers
Arthur Edward Waite
John Yarker
Robert Felkin
Frederick Bligh Bond

Modern times
The Societas Rosicruciana in Anglia has led to a number of similar organisations in different countries such as Scotland, Canada, and two in America.

References

Sources

External links
Societas Rosicruciana in Anglia - Official Website.
Seven Steps of Wisdom: an online course of introduction to the principles of the SRIA.
Bishop Wilkins SRIA College An SRIA college with papers, Rosicrucian texts and information about the Society.

 

Hermeticism
Masonic organizations
Rosicrucianism